Sami Panico (born 4 June 1993) is an Italian rugby union player of Ethiopian descent who plays as a Prop, he currently plays for Calvisano. Panico made his debut for the Italian national team in June 2016 and was part of the squad for the 2017 Six Nations Championship.

In 2014 and 2016, Panico was a permit player for Zebre, but he didn't play in official matches.

On 1 October 2018, it was announced that Panico had been arrested after 1.5 kilos of marijuana, 330 grammes of hashish and €10,000 in cash were discovered in the garden of his home in Rome, Italy. His rugby club, Zebre, suspended him on 8 September 2018 while the investigation was taking place. On 5 October 2018, Zebre announced that they had cancelled Panico's contract with the club.

References

External links
ESPN Profile

1993 births
Living people
Italian rugby union players
Italy international rugby union players
Rugby union locks